is a four-episode late night Japanese television drama series. The series receive collaboration with Tsuburaya Productions for the production and appearance of Ultra Monsters in the series.

The series takes place in mid-1970s and focuses on club members who have devoted to the Kaiju of Tokusatsu shows while trying to self-publish a magazine that deals with the topic. Each episodes feature the guest appearance of monsters from Ultra Series.

Characters
: The main protagonist. A 22 years old college student and an ace member of Kaiju Club.
: 17 years old. A high school student who is rather mature despite his age.
: 22 years old. An honorable college student.
: 22 years old. An otaku who has a habit of fixing other's mistake.
: 24 years old. An artistic member of Kaiju Club who can draw monsters.
: 33 years old. A salaryman who supports the Kaiju Club. He is also knowledgeable in musics.
: 33 years old. Number 2 member of Kaiju Club who often gave ideas to others. He is also a magazine writer.
:  Age unknown, he is the mysterious founder of the Kaiju Club.

Ultra Monsters
:
:
:
:

Cast
Kanata Hongō as Ryōta
Ryusei Yokohama as Katsuo
Masato Yano as Shingo
Ryo Kato as Yūsuke
Shogo Yamaguchi as Nishi
Tokio Emoto as Jō
Muga Tsukaji as Cap
Fumika Baba as Yuriko

References

External links
 

Japanese drama television series
2017 Japanese television series debuts
2017 Japanese television series endings
Mainichi Broadcasting System original programming